The Charlotte Hornets are an American professional basketball team based in Charlotte, North Carolina. They play in the Southeast Division of the Eastern Conference in the National Basketball Association (NBA). The Hornets were first established in 1988 as an expansion team, but relocated to New Orleans following the 2001–02 season.  In 2004, a new expansion team, the Charlotte Bobcats, was established. After 10 seasons as the Bobcats, the team changed its name to the Charlotte Hornets for the 2014–15 season, a year after the New Orleans franchise relinquished the Hornets name and renamed itself the Pelicans. In addition to re-inheriting the Hornets name from New Orleans, the Charlotte franchise reclaimed the history and records of the original 1988–2002 Hornets, effectively becoming a continuation of the original franchise.

The Hornets have played their home games at the Spectrum Center, formerly known as the Charlotte Bobcats Arena and the Time Warner Cable Arena, since 2005. Their principal owner is Michael Jordan, with founding owner Robert L. Johnson and Cornell Haynes holding minority interests. Their current staffs consists of Rich Cho as general manager and Steve Clifford as head coach.

As of January 7 of the 2022-23 season, there have been 282 past and current players who have appeared in at least one game for the Hornets franchise. Robert Parish and Alonzo Mourning are the only Hornets to have been inducted into the Basketball Hall of Fame. Mourning, Larry Johnson, Glen Rice, Eddie Jones, Baron Davis, Gerald Wallace, and Kemba Walker are the only Hornets selected to play in an All-Star Game. Twelve players have received rookie-related honors. Johnson (1991–92), Emeka Okafor (2004–05), and LaMelo Ball (2020-21) have been named Rookie of the Year. Eight Hornets have been selected to the All-Rookie Second Team: Rex Chapman (1988–89), J. R. Reid (1989–90), Raymond Felton (2005–06), Adam Morrison and Wálter Herrmann (2006–07), D. J. Augustin (2008–09), Michael Kidd-Gilchrist (2012–13), and Cody Zeller (2013–14). George Zidek, drafted in 1995, was the first foreign-born player to be selected by the Hornets. Kemba Walker is the franchise's all-time leading scorer with 12,009 points, the only player to score more thatn 10,000 with the franchise. Okafor leads all players in rebounds with 3,516 and Muggsy Bogues leads all players in assists with 5,557.

The following list and all statistics within is accurate as of January 7, 2023.

Players

Notes
 Players can sometimes be assigned more than one jersey number and play more than one position. The primary playing position is listed first.
 Statistics were last updated January 7, 2023.

References
General

Marcus Culpepper
FIBA Player Camp

External links
Charlotte Hornets official website

National Basketball Association all-time rosters
roster